Ockbrook and Borrowash is a civil parish in the borough of Erewash in the county of Derbyshire in England.

It straddles the A52 a few miles east of Derby and contains two adjacent villages of very different character: Ockbrook, which lies just north of the A52 and Borrowash which lies to the south.

The 2001 Census records Ockbrook and Borrowash having a population of 7,331 people, with 1,443 being aged 0–15, 4,504 being 16-64 and 1,384 being 65 or older.  These people make up 3006 households.  2,456 of the homes are owner occupied (81.7%), higher than the Derbyshire average of 74.4%. The unemployment rate is 2.5%, less than the Derbyshire average of 3.2%. The civil parish population at the 2011 Census had increased marginally to 7,335.

See also
Listed buildings in Ockbrook and Borrowash

References

External links 
Ockbrook and Borrowash Community Information Service
The Ockash Trust
Parish Council
Local Councillors
Ockbrook and Borrowash 2001 Census Summary Profile
Ockbrook School

Civil parishes in Derbyshire
Borough of Erewash